The Fante class was a class of 3 destroyers by the Italian Navy. They entered service in 1969, with the last one being decommissioned in 1977.

History 
The ships underwent changes compared to their original armament, and being very worn ships, served only for five years, except the Lanciere which was immediately disarmed and cannibalized to provide spare parts for her two sisters. 

The ships purchased were in fact initially two, the USS Walker (Fante) and USS Taylor (Lanciere) who joined the Navy in June 1969. The disastrous conditions of the second ship, however, led to purchase in January 1970 a third unit, the USS Prichett (Geniere). The Lanciere, therefore, was reused to supply spare parts to the two sister units.

Ships in the class

References 

Destroyer classes
Fante-class destroyers
Cold War naval ships of Italy
Destroyers of the Italian Navy